George Noble (fl. 1795–1806) was an English line-engraver. The son of Edward Noble, author of Elements of Linear Perspective, he was brother to Samuel Noble and William Bonneau Noble.

Works
Noble made engravings for John Boydell's edition of Shakespeare (1802):

 "Borachio, Conrade, and Watchman", after Francis Wheatley, scene from Much Ado about Nothing;
 "Bassanio, Portia, and Attendants", after Richard Westall, from The Merchant of Venice;
 "Orlando and Adam", after Robert Smirke, from As you like it;
 "Desdemona in bed asleep", after Josiah Boydell, from Othello; and "Cleopatra, Guards, ...", after Henry Tresham, from Antony and Cleopatra.

He engraved also the subjects for Robert Bowyer's edition of David Hume's The History of England, 1806:

 "Canute reproving his Courtiers", "Henry VIII and Catharine Parr", "Charles I imprisoned in Carisbrooke Castle", "Lord William Russell's last Interview with his Family", and "The Bishops before the Privy Council", after Robert Smirke;
 "William I receiving the Crown of England", after Benjamin West; and
 "The Landing of William III at Torbay", after Thomas Stothard.

Noble's works included also:

 eighteen oval portraits of Admiral Lord Duncan and other naval officers, from miniatures by John Smart, which form part of a large plate designed by Robert Smirke, and engraved by James Parker, in commemoration of the battle of Camperdown on 11 October 1797;
 Maternal Instruction, after Christian Borckhardt;
 portraits of Lady Jane Grey and Rosamond Clifford; and
 illustrations to Oliver Goldsmith's Miscellaneous Works, from drawings by Richard Cook.

Notes

Attribution

English engravers
18th-century English people
19th-century English people
Year of birth missing
Year of death missing